Steelyard Blues is a 1973 American comedy crime film directed by Alan Myerson and starring Donald Sutherland, Jane Fonda and Peter Boyle.

Plot
A group of misfits tries to find a happier life against the norms of society. Donald Sutherland plays an ex-con with a passion for demolition derbies.  He has wrecked almost every possible car. He violates his parole when confronted by a 1950 Studebaker. This embarrasses his brother, a politically ambitious district attorney played by Howard Hesseman in an unlikely respectable role.  Jane Fonda plays a prostitute engaging in an off-again/on-again relationship with Sutherland's character. The plot hilariously thickens when this gang of merry misfits tries to repair an old Consolidated PBY Catalina airplane, and get it flying again.

Cast
Mel Stewart – Black Man in Jail
Donald Sutherland – Jesse Veldini
Howard Hesseman – Frank Veldini
Morgan Upton – Police Capt. Bill
Peter Boyle – Eagle Thornberry
Jessica Myerson – Savage Rose
Beans Morocco – Rocky (as Dan Barrows)
John Savage – Kid
Jane Fonda – Iris Caine
Nancy Fish – Pool Hall Waitress
Roger Bowen – Fire Commissioner Francis
Garry Goodrow – Duval Jax
Lynette Bernay – Bar Waitress
Richard Schaal – Zoo Official Mel
Edward Greenberg – Rookie Cop

Alternate title
In 1979, the film was broadcast on NBC under the title, Final Crash.

Soundtrack album
All tracks written by Nick Gravenites and Mike Bloomfield, except where indicated.

Side One
 "Swing With It"
 "Brand New Family"
 "Woman's Love"
 "Make the Headlines"
 "Georgia Blues" (Maria Muldaur/Bloomfield/Gravenites)
 "My Bag (The Oysters)"
 "Common Ground"

Side Two
 "Being Different"
 "I've Been Searching"
 "Do I Care" (Merl Saunders/Muldaur)
 "Lonesome Star Blues" (Maria Muldaur)
 "Here I Come (There She Goes)"
 "If You Cared"
 "Theme from Steelyard Blues (Drive Again)"

Performers:  John Kahn, Chris Parker, Merl Saunders, Annie Sampson, Mike Bloomfield, Maria Muldaur, Nick Gravenites, Paul Butterfield

References

External links
 
 

1973 films
1970s crime comedy films
American aviation films
American crime comedy films
Films directed by Alan Myerson
Films produced by Michael Phillips (producer)
Films produced by Julia Phillips
Films with screenplays by David S. Ward
Warner Bros. films
1973 directorial debut films
1973 comedy films
1970s English-language films
1970s American films